Live! One Night Only is a live album by Patti LaBelle, released in September 1998 through the record label MCA.  The album earned LaBelle the Grammy Award for Best Traditional R&B Vocal Performance. The album was recorded in New York at the Hammerstein Ballroom on June 2, 1998.

Track listing
Disc 1

 "I Believe" (Ervin Drake, Irvin Graham, Jimmy Shirl, Al Stillman) – 3:55
 "When You Talk About Love" (Harris, Lewis, Ann Nesby, James "Big Jim" Wright) – 4:59
 "Flame" (Ira Antelis, Brenda Russell) – 4:28
 "He Doesn't Love You" (Sandy Knox, Billy Stritch) – 3:01
 "New Attitude" (Jon Gilutin, Bunny Hull, Sharon Robinson) – 2:23
 "If You Asked Me To" (Diane Warren) – 3:13
 "If Only You Knew" (Cynthia Biggs, Gamble, Dexter Wansel) – 7:13
 "You Are My Friend" (Armstead Edwards, James Budd Ellison, Patti LaBelle) – 5:21
 "Lord's Side" (Timothy Wright) – 6:12

 Disc 2

 "The Bells" (Anna Gordy Gaye, Marvin Gaye, Iris Gordy, Elgie Stover) – 3:17
 "Is It Still Good to You" (Nickolas Ashford, Valerie Simpson) – 4:41 - duet with Gerald Levert
 "Don't Make Me Over" (Burt Bacharach, Hal David) – 3:13
 "If You Love Me" (Marguerite Monnot, Geoffrey Parsons) – 6:35
 "On My Own" (Burt Bacharach, Carole Bayer Sager) – 5:14
 "Sparkle" (Curtis Mayfield) – 1:05
 "Got to Be Real" (Cheryl Lynn, David Paich, David Foster) – 3:24 - duet with Mariah Carey.
 "Lady Marmalade" (Bob Crewe, Kenny Nolan) – 5:08
 "Patti Talk" – 3:09
 "A Change Is Gonna Come" (Sam Cooke) – 4:04
 "Hold On (Change Is Comin')" (Clarke, Reid, Seacer, Steele, Troutman, Roger Troutman) – 4:55 - collaboration with Gerald Levert and Eddie Levert
 "Over the Rainbow" (Harold Arlen, Yip Harburg) – 5:12
 "I Believe I Can Fly" (R. Kelly) – 2:51

Personnel
Patti LaBelle - vocals
James "Herb" Smith - guitar
Manuel Yanes - bass guitar
John Beal - acoustic bass
Nathaniel Wilkie - keyboards, assistant musical director
John Stanley - piano, keyboards, backing vocals
John Blackwell - drums
José Rossy - percussion
Emily Mitchell - harp
Gary Topper - tenor saxophone
Harvey Estrin - alto saxophone
Roger Rosenberg - baritone saxophone
George Flynn - bass trombone
Hollis Burridge, Lew Soloff - trumpet
Jim Pugh, Larry Farrell - trombone
Bob Carlisle - French horn
Jeanne Leblanc, Mark Shuman - cello
Abe Appleman, Ann Leathers, Charles Libove, Eric Wyrick, Jean Ingraham, Joel Pitchon, Richard Rood, Robert Chausow - violin
Carol Landon, Karen Dreyfus, Mary Hammann - viola
James Budd Ellison - musical director, conductor, arrangements
Jack Faith, Richard Di Cicco - string arrangements
Emil Charlap - conductor

Chart performance
Live! One Night Only reached peak positions of number 182 on the Billboard 200 and number 51 on the Top R&B Albums chart.

Legacy
The duet cover of "Got to Be Real" was used as the title and theme song of the parody digital series Got 2B Real, which featured LaBelle and Carey as lead characters.

References

1998 live albums
Grammy Award for Best Traditional R&B Vocal Performance
MCA Records live albums
Patti LaBelle albums
albums produced by Arif Mardin